Damon Winter (born December 24, 1974) is a New York based photographer who specializes in documentary, editorial, and travel photography. He received a Pulitzer Prize for feature photography in 2009 while with The New York Times.

Life
Born on December 24, 1974, in Elmira, New York, Winter grew up in St. Thomas in the United States Virgin Islands. He earned a bachelor's degree in environmental science from Columbia University and worked for The Dallas Morning News, Newsweek, Magnum Photos, The Ventura County Star and The Indianapolis Star. Winter joined The New York Times in 2007 after three years as a staff photographer at the Los Angeles Times. He lives in Brooklyn.

Awards
Winter's photo essay on sexual abuse victims in western Alaska was a finalist for the 2005 Pulitzer Prize for feature photography. In 2009 he received the Pulitzer Prize for feature photography, for his coverage of  Barack Obama's 2008 presidential campaign.

See also
2009 Pulitzer Prize

References

External links
 
 https://www.nytimes.com/interactive/2008/08/27/us/politics/20080827-winterobama-mutimedia/index.html

The New York Times visual journalists
Columbia College (New York) alumni
Pulitzer Prize for Feature Photography winners
American photojournalists
People from Elmira, New York
Living people
1974 births
Photographers from New York (state)
21st-century American journalists